A Steam chamber is an enclosed space containing steam. Relevant articles include:

 Steambath
 Steam room